Alberton Oval is located in Alberton, a north-western suburb of Adelaide, South Australia. The ground is a public park and is exclusively leased to the Port Adelaide Football Club for Australian rules football.

History

With the nearby Queenstown Oval built upon in 1876, the Alberton and Queenstown Council opted to construct a cricketing ground on the land adjacent Brougham Place in 1876. The land was donated by the former Mayor of Port Adelaide, John Formby. The Queen and Albert Oval was officially opened on 8 November 1877 for a game between the touring Tasmanian cricket team and a selected eleven of the Queen and Albert Cricket Association.

Port Adelaide Football Club
While several teams played at the Alberton Oval in the ground's early days, it is most famous for being the training and administration base for the Port Adelaide Football Club since it played its first game on 15 May 1880 and defeated the original, now-defunct Kensington Football Club 1-nil. 

Port Adelaide has played all its South Australian National Football League (SANFL) home games at the ground since 1880. When the club commenced playing in the Australian Football League (AFL) in 1997, it played home matches at Football Park in West Lakes, until 2014 when AFL matches were moved to the Adelaide Oval near the city. The club continued fielding a team in the SANFL after accession to the AFL, and continued to play home matches at Alberton Oval. Initially the SANFL team was legally separate from the club's AFL operations, until the two were re-unified in 2010. Since 2014 Port Adelaide's SANFL team has been a reserve team for the club. The club commenced fielding a women's team in the AFL Women's league in 2022, and play home matches at Alberton Oval.

All of the club's teams, including its AFL, AFLW and SANFL teams, conduct their principal trainings at the ground.

The Allan Scott Power Headquarters stands adjacent to the oval. So too does The Port Club, a social venue for the club's supporters and players, which was opened on 14 November 1954.

Alberton is regarded as the "spiritual home" of Port Adelaide due to the club (in the SANFL) playing almost all of their homes games there since commencing its tenancy. The club's AFL team usually plays one or two trial games at the ground during the pre-season.

Many notable Australian rules footballers have played for Port Adelaide on the ground, including 3 time Brownlow and Sandover Medalist Haydn Bunton Sr, four time SANFL Magarey Medal winner and club games record holder (392) Russell Ebert, nine time premiership coach Fos Williams, local junior and future Carlton player Craig Bradley, 1992 Best and Fairest winner Nathan Buckley, 1993 Brownlow Medallist Gavin Wanganeen and Port Adelaide's first ever AFL coach, John Cahill who also coached the club to 10 SANFL premierships.

Cheltenham cemetery curse 
For a long time such was the Port Adelaide Football Club's dominance at Alberton Oval with a win percentage of 78% from its first year at the ground in 1880 to joining the AFL in 1997 there has been conjecture that opposition teams became cursed as they passed by Cheltenham cemetery on the way to the ground. 

Malcolm Blight as coach for Woodville played up the curse for his players in the lead up to a match, parking the bus before the cemetery, and making his players walk past Cheltenham cemetery. Unfortunately it didn't work and Woodville still lost but Blight suggests his team would've lost by more if he didn't make everyone walk past.

Interstate pre-season matches
 1888 September 17 – Port Adelaide vs. Broken Hill
 1913 July 26 – Port Adelaide vs. North Fremantle
 1925 August 25 – Port Adelaide vs. South Fremantle
 1931 October 15 – Port Adelaide vs. Geelong
 1968 – Port Adelaide vs. Melbourne
 1968 – Port Adelaide vs. South Melbourne
 1969 March 22 – Port Adelaide vs. Melbourne
 1971 March 14 – Port Adelaide vs. Melbourne
 1979 March 31 – Port Adelaide vs. Footscray
 1981 March 14 – Port Adelaide vs. Richmond
 1982 March 13 – Port Adelaide vs. Richmond
 1997 February 9 – Port Adelaide vs. Richmond
 2014 March 8 – Port Adelaide vs. St Kilda
 2019 March 9 – Port Adelaide vs. North Melbourne

2022/23 redevelopment
In 2021, Port Adelaide club officials revealed plans for a redevelopment of the Alberton Oval and surrounding precinct, to include an additional indoor training and administration venue for football, which would feature two basketball courts and an adjacent outdoor soccer pitch. Upgrades to the existing change-rooms and training buildings for men's and women's players were also proposed, as well as spectator amenities and additional spaces for parked cars. The plans were opposed by several local residents who claimed it would exacerbate traffic and congestion issues, though club officials pointed to the expanded car-park spaces available for staff and players, and the opportunities available for local community sports groups to utilise the facilities. The proposal was granted approval by the City of Port Adelaide Enfield council on 9 November 2021. The estimated cost of the redevelopment is $30 million, of which $15 million was financed from the federal government in an announcement made on 27 November 2021. The other half of the cost was raised by the South Australian government's Office for Recreation and Sport, the AFL and the club, and several undisclosed club benefactors. 

The first completed component of the upgrades was The Precinct at Alberton, a multi-purpose events and administration centre attached to the Robert Quinn grandstand, which was completed in June 2022. The precinct includes the club museum, store, membership services, private event spaces and a large bar, restaurant and kitchen with views over Alberton Oval and toward the Adelaide Hills. Dedicated facilities for the women's team were completed prior to the August 2022 season. The women's football program is located within and along the length of the Fos Williams Stand, and includes expansive locker-rooms, player recovery and administration offices, a team meeting room and a lounge. The redevelopment of the Allan Scott HQ building and addition of the adjacent High Performance Centre and outdoor training/soccer field, located on the eastern side of the oval, commenced in October 2022, with construction expected to be completed 12 months thereafter.

Ground records

Highest score 
 33.24 (222) – Port Adelaide def. South Adelaide (1988).

Largest margin 
 160 – Port Adelaide def. West Adelaide (1903).

Most goals in a match 
 16 – Tim Evans, Port Adelaide (1980)

Longest winning streak 
 31 – Port Adelaide (1909, Round 9 → 1915, Round 7)

Cricket
Alberton Oval was used as a cricket ground during summer between 1877 and 1996. Following the opening game between Tasmania and the Queen and Albert Cricket Association in 1877, the ground became the home of the new Port Adelaide Cricket Club in 1897 and remained so until the end of 1996.

In the early years attention needed to be paid to the state of the outfield. An example of this need was when Port Adelaide batsman G.S.P. Jones was able to run 8 while making 143 not out against West Torrens in 1904-05 because the fieldsman could not find the ball amongst the weeds. Cricket and football shared the use of the oval for a century, until the Port Adelaide Football Club was elevated into the AFL in 1997 and required the full-year use of the ground.

The cricket club now plays games at the Port Reserve in Port Adelaide.

Grandstands
The grounds main stands and features are:

Fos Williams Family Stand 

Opened in 1903. The oldest remaining structure at Alberton Oval, the Fos Williams stand houses the SANFL change rooms, coaching and media boxes. It also is the location of plaques commemorating members of the Williams family.

Robert B. Quinn MM Grandstand 

Opened in 1964, the grandstand houses the Port Club bistro, Bob McLean sportsbar, Port Store and upstairs function room.

Allan Scott Power Headquarters 
Built with donations provided by businessman Allan Scott, government grants and funding provided by the sale of personalised pavers laid around the Oval precinct, the Headquarters house the administration of the Port Adelaide Football Club along with the AFL training facilities. The Headquarters also have a balcony that overlooks the ground. In 2010 the HQ was upgraded, the cornerstone of which was the Mark Williams Facility, which allows players to train indoors during extreme weather conditions.

N.L. Williams Scoreboard 
Named after Port Adelaide and South Australian cricketer Norman Williams, the scoreboard is located on the South East pocket.

Attendance records

Football
The attendance record at the ground for an Australian rules football match was 22,738 during a match against Norwood on 11 June 1977.

Concert

References and notes

External links

Official website of the Port Adelaide Football Club
Port Adelaide Cricket Club
 

Port Adelaide Football Club
Australian rules football grounds
Sports venues in Adelaide
Cricket grounds in Australia
Sports venues completed in 1877
1877 establishments in Australia